The Josiah Scott House in Annis, Idaho was listed on the National Register of Historic Places in 1982.

It is a one-and-one-half-story Colonial Revival stone house.  It was during 1908-1910 by stonemason Alexander Whitehead using gray tuff stone from Menan Butte, with lighter tone stone used in quoins, sills, lintels, and the foundation.  It has two brick chimneys.

It was home of Josiah Scott, a homesteader whose patent on the land was completed in 1893.

See also

 List of National Historic Landmarks in Idaho
 National Register of Historic Places listings in Jefferson County, Idaho

References

Houses in Jefferson County, Idaho
Houses on the National Register of Historic Places in Idaho
Colonial Revival architecture in Idaho
National Register of Historic Places in Jefferson County, Idaho